Phellinidium is a genus of fungi in the family Hymenochaetaceae. The genus, circumscribed in 1984, contains three species found in Europe.

References

Hymenochaetaceae
Agaricomycetes genera